Svea Virginia Kågemark, (born in Stockholm on December 28, 1999) with Greek credentials, also known under the artist name SVEA, is a Swedish artist and songwriter living in Stockholm. She grew up in Hammarby lake town.

Career 
Svea started by posting covers on YouTube that attracted the attention of producers in the industry. These introduced her to an A&R at Universal Music Sweden who chose to sign Svea on her 18th birthday. Svea has studied singing at Rytmus Musikgymnasium in Stockholm like alumni Robyn, Tove Lo and Icona Pop.

She released her first song "Don't Mind Me" the same day (June 8, 2018) as she took the student from Rytmus Musikgymnasium. "Don't Mind Me" ended up on Spotify Viral in Sweden and made headlines because she sang about enjoying her own sexuality as a young woman. In 2019, she released a 7-track EP "This is" and gained the attention of international media. In January 2019, she released the song "Complicated" together with the Danish artist Alexander Oscar. "Complicated" ended up in 16th place on Spotify's most listened songs in Denmark and has sold platinum in Denmark and gold in Norway and performed on X Factor with the song. On June 15, SVEA performed at Brilliant Minds 2019, an international conference hosted by Spotify founder Daniel Ek and manager Ash Pournouri. That same year, Barack Obama, Greta Thunberg and Naomi Campbell stood on the same stage. In the fall of 2019, she was associated with Picture This at their concerts in the UK and Germany, resulting in 13 shows. In 2020, SVEA released its second EP entitled "Pity Party". Svea also wrote Rhys Spotify It Hits single "We Don't Talk Anyway". On New Year's Eve 2020, SVEA performed together with Zikai on SVT's 'Tolvslaget på Skansen' with the song "Don't Stop The Music", a cover of Rihanna's song of the same name, which was made exclusively for the performance.

Discography

EP 
 2019 – This Is
 2020 - Pity Party

Singles 
 2018 – Don' t Mind Me
 2018 – Selfish
 2019 - Complicated (with Alexander Oscar)
 2019 – Love Me Now
 2019 – Good at Losing
 2020 – Numb (feat. Ernia)
 2020 – Give & Take (with Wankelmut)
 2020 – All My Exes
 2020 – Need To Know (with Alexander Oscar)
 2020 – Never Call Me Again
 2020 – I'll Get Better
 2020 – Don't Stop The Music (with Zikai)
 2021 – I'll Get Better (with Call Me Loop)
 2022 - “Iconic”

References

External links
SVEA at Spotify

1999 births
Living people

Swedish songwriters
Swedish people of Greek descent